This is a list of notable successful swims across the English Channel, a straight-line distance of about .

First attempts

After a seaman had floated across the Channel on a bundle of straw, Matthew Webb made the crossing without the aid of artificial buoyancy. His first attempt ended in failure, but on 25 August 1875, he started from Admiralty Pier in Dover and made the crossing in 21 hours and 45 minutes, despite challenging tides (which delayed him for 5 hours) and a jellyfish sting.

80 failed attempts were made by a variety of people before Thomas William Burgess, who on 6 September 1911 became the second person to successfully make the crossing. He crossed from Dover to Cap Gris Nez in 22 hours and 35 minutes at his 16th bid. Burgess ate a hearty meal of ham and eggs before starting his swim and had only trained for 18 hours before he made the crossing, with his longest practice being .

Henry Sullivan was successful in his seventh attempt. He entered the water in Dover at 4:20 on Sunday afternoon, 5 August 1923. Choppy waters and capricious tides forced him to swim an estimated . He reached shore at Calais at 8:05 in the evening of 6 August, finishing in 27 hours and 45 minutes. Two other swimmers completed the swim that same summer. Enrique Tirabocchi, from Argentina, completed the swim on 13 August, finishing in a record time of 16 hours and 33 minutes and becoming the first person to swim the route starting from the French side of the Channel. American Charles Toth of Boston completed the swim on 9 September 1923, in 16 hours and 40 minutes, missing by two days the expiration of a £1,000 prize offered by the Daily Sketch for anyone who completed the swim, a prize that both Sullivan and Tirabocchi received from a representative of the Daily Sketch waiting on the shore with a cheque in hand.

Gertrude Ederle's successful cross-channel swim began at Gris Nez in France at 07:05 on the morning of 6 August 1926. Her trainer was Burgess. She came ashore at Kingsdown, Kent, England, in a total time of 14 hours and 39 minutes, making her the first woman to complete the crossing and setting the record for the fastest time, breaking the previous mark set by Tirabocchi by almost two hours. A reporter from The New York Times, who had accompanied Ederle's support team on a tugboat, recounted that Ederle was confronted by a British immigrations official, who recorded the biographical details of Ederle and the individuals on board the ship, none of whom had been carrying their passports. Ederle was finally allowed to come ashore, after promising that she would report to the authorities the following morning.

L. Walter Lissberger financed the $3,000 in expenses that Amelia Gade Corson and her husband incurred in preparing for the Channel swim. Lissberger made a wager with Lloyd's of London betting that she would succeed in crossing the Channel, and received a payout of $100,000 at odds of 20–1 when she completed her swim. She was one of three swimmers who were trying to make the swim across the Channel at the same time starting at 11:32 at night on 28 August 1926, leaving from Cape Gris Nez. The two men with her failed, Egyptian swimmer Ishak Helmy dropping out after three hours and an English swimmer failing one mile (1.6 km) from Dover's Shakespeare Cliffs. With her husband rowing alongside in a dory and providing her with hot chocolate, sugar lumps and crackers, she completed the swim in a time of 15 hours and 29 minutes, one hour longer than the record set by Gertrude Ederle three weeks earlier.

First swims

Records

Fastest

Most crossings

Oldest swimmer

Youngest swimmer

Relay

References

External links
 Full list of successful Channel swims, records, statistics and swimmer information
 Full list of Channel swim results, records and swimmer information
 Newsreel film of Philip Mickman's swim in a BBC Archive tweet

 
Open water swimming
Eng